Edwin Hatfield Anderson (September 27, 1861 – April 29, 1947) was a prominent American library leader during the first third of the 20th century, serving as director of both the Carnegie Library of Pittsburgh and the New York Public Library. He also served as the president of the American Library Association in 1913-14.

Biography
Anderson was born in Zionsville, Indiana. He graduated from Wabash College in 1883, receiving his master's degree (A.M.) in 1887. Anderson worked with Andrew Carnegie to create the Carnegie Library in Pittsburgh, Pennsylvania in 1895, and served as the director of that library until 1904, when he stepped down because he could not afford to support his family on the salary. After a two-year stint (1906–08) as the head of the New York State Library and Library School, Anderson became the director of the New York Public Library in 1909, a position he held until 1934.

As a library leader, Anderson was best remembered for the librarian education programs he established in both Pittsburgh and New York City.

Anderson was married, with at least two children, daughters Charlotte and Cecile. He died in Evanston, Illinois.

References

 
 

1861 births
1947 deaths
American librarians
New York Public Library people
Presidents of the American Library Association